Don Diego de Benavides de la Cueva y Bazán, 1st Marquess of Solera and 8th Count of Santisteban del Puerto (sometimes Don Diego Benavides y de la Cueva, conde de Santisteban del Puerto) (1607, Santisteban del Puerto, Jaén, Spain – ca. March 19, 1666, Lima, Peru), was a Spanish military officer, diplomat, writer and colonial administrator. From December 31, 1661 to March 16, 1666 he was viceroy of Peru.

Benavides received a Humanistic education with the Jesuits of the Colegio Imperial de Madrid.

He was a Knight of the Order of Santiago and a gentleman of the king's bedchamber. He fought in Aragon and Portugal. After the 1643 war with Portugal, he was Captain General of the Borders. Later he was Governor of Galicia. In 1653 he was named Viceroy and Captain General of Navarre. For his valuable diplomatic services in the negotiation of the 1659 Peace of the Pyrenees and the subsequent marriage of Princess Maria Teresa of Austria with Louis XIV of France, King Philip IV made him Marquis de Solera.

His writings included Epigramas latinos del humanista giennense D. Diego de Benavides y de la Cueva (Latin epigrams) and Horae succisiuae siue Elucubrationes. The latter work was a poetic anthology compiled by his sons Francisco and Manuel de Benavides and published in 1660 (second edition, 1664).

In 1661 he was named Viceroy of Peru. During his administration, he was much concerned about the condition of the Indigenous, particularly their education and labor conditions. To address these concerns he issued the Ordenanza de Obrajes (Ordenance of Manufactures) in 1664.

He faced earthquakes to epidemics, and had to suppress fighting between Spanish miners. San Bartolomé hospital was built during his term of office. He built the first theater in Lima. He died in that city in 1666.

References

External links

 Short biography
 Short biography (Archived 2009-10-31)
 A few biographical details

|-

1607 births
1666 deaths
Counts of Spain
Marquesses of Spain
Viceroys of Peru
Viceroys of Navarre
Knights of Santiago
Spanish diplomats
University of Salamanca alumni